Carlon Jeffery (born July 10, 1993) is an American actor and rapper. He is best known for playing Cameron Parks in the Disney Channel sitcom A.N.T. Farm (2011–2013).

Life and career 

Jeffery was born in Houston, Texas and has been performing since the age of eight. He grew up in Cincinnati, Ohio, performing in numerous community venues. He and his family moved to Los Angeles, California in 2005, so he could pursue a career his music and acting. In 2017, Jeffery had a daughter with Yaneris Mendiola named Giselle Ariana. Jeffery frequently visits the Bay Area to see Giselle and Mendiola.

Within the next year, he landed his first notable acting role, a guest appearance in It's Always Sunny in Philadelphia. In 2007, he had a three-episode stint in the drama Heroes. His other television credits include Bones and Trust Me.

He co-starred as Cameron Parks in the Disney Channel sitcom A.N.T. Farm, which premiered in 2011. He left the show after the second season ended and Aedin Mincks joined the main cast in the third season. However, in October 2013, he did appear on the show as a guest star. He returned for one episode "feature presANTation" in the third and final season of A.N.T. Farm.

In music, Jeffery is also a rapper, performing under the pseudonym Lil' C-Note. He has a twin sister, Carla Jeffery, who is an actress.

Filmography

Music video

Discography

Albums/Soundtracks 

 A.N.T Farm (2 songs: "Pose" and "Summertime")

References

External links 

 
 

1993 births
Male actors from Cincinnati
Male actors from Houston
American male child actors
African-American rappers
American male film actors
American male television actors
Living people
Fraternal twin male actors
Rappers from Houston
Rappers from Cincinnati
21st-century American rappers
21st-century African-American musicians